

São Bernardo may refer to:

Places
 São Bernardo do Campo, Brazil
 São Bernardo, Maranhão, Brazil
 São Bernardo (parish), Portugal

Sports
C.D. São Bernardo (handball), a Portuguese handball club 
São Bernardo Futebol Clube, a Brazilian football club
Esporte Clube São Bernardo, a Brazilian football club

Other
São Bernardo (film), or S. Bernardo, a 1972 film directed by Leon Hirszman

See also
 Saint Bernard (disambiguation)
 Bernard (disambiguation)